Monta is a given name which may refer to:

Monta Bell (1891–1958), American film director
Monta Ellis (born 1985), basketball player
Monta Mino (born 1944), Japanese television presenter
Monta (Eyeshield 21), a fictional character in the Eyeshield 21 series

See also
Montas